Red or Dead is a novel by British author David Peace. It details Bill Shankly's period as manager of Liverpool football club from his appointment in 1959 to his unexpected resignation in 1974.

The novel was shortlisted for the inaugural Goldsmiths Prize (2013).

References

2013 British novels
Novels by David Peace
Biographical novels
Liverpool F.C.
Novels about association football
Novels set in Liverpool
Faber and Faber books